The cuisine of Gascony is one of the pillars of French cuisine. Its originality stems from its use of regional products and from an age-old tradition, typical of the Aquitane and the Midi-Pyrenees, of cooking in fat, in particular goose and duck fat, whereas the cuisine of the south of France favours frying in oil and the cuisine of Normandy contains more dishes that are simmered or cooked in butter. The long life expectancy of Gascons, despite a rich diet, is a classic example of the French paradox.

Main elements

The cuisine of Gascony is characterised by the use of regional products such as duck fat and duck foie gras, salted ham, and the famous mild chilli of Gascony.  Common condiments are Bezolles mustard, garlic, persillade, and onion.  The cèpe mushroom is frequently eaten; Tricholoma equestre was traditionally eaten but is now considered poisonous after several cases of rhabdomyolysis were linked to its consumption.  Larks and the common wood pigeon are commonly eaten game birds; the ortolan, previously commonly eaten, has been a protected species since 1999.  Coastal seafood includes oysters, peppery furrowshells, eel elvers, lampreys, and shad.

Commonly consumed wine includes clarets (rosés) and tannic reds, the most important being Bordeaux wine (cabernets and merlot), but also Madiran wines (tannat and cabernets), the most tannic and well suited to the local food.  Dessert wines, ideal with brioche, chestnuts and foie gras, are usually those local to Bordeaux (Sauternes and Béarn (Jurançon AOC et Pacherenc). Côtes de Gascogne and Armagnac are used in cooking, and to flavour tourtières.

Rural family gatherings will often include grilled chestnuts with a glass of vin bourru (sweet and in the process of fermentation, sold with no cork), as well as roste, grilled bread, rubbed with garlic or with tjonque (a sauce made from the leftover juices of pan-fried duck).

Soups

 Garbure

Entrées

 Foie gras, either candied or fried fresh in cutlet form
 Landaise salad, which is characterised by its use of duck breast and gizzards
 Smoked duck breast
 Bayonne ham
 Crépinettes of Bordeaux
 Baby eels
 Sanquette, a fried dish made from lamb blood, garlic, sweet onions, parsley and pancetta

Main course 

 Chalosse beef
 Duck confit
 Duck breast
 Pigeon stew
 Stew made from Gascon pig
 Omelette using sweet Gascon chillies 
 Omelette using cep mushrooms (Boletus edulis)
 Lampreys "à la Bordelaise" (cooked in a dark sauce, made from Lamprey blood)
 "Tricandilles" (boiled porc tripe, grilled on a barbecue)
 "Millas" a tart made from corn flour with a savoury accompaniment

Cheese
 "Amou", a sheep's cheese, made in the Amou region

Desserts

 "Pastis landais", a cake flavoured with orange blossom, vanilla and rum
 Canelés
 Tourtière, a tart with apples or prunes
 Croustade, decorated with puff pastry
 "Cruchades", fried corn cakes
 "Millas" with sweet accompaniments

See also 

 Occitan cuisine
 Basque cuisine

Bibliography 
 Rémy Constans, Gastronomie gasconne à la Belle Époque, Association de livres en livres, Bon-Encontre, 1998
 Jean-Claude Ulian, Gascons à table, Art-Média, 2004

Notes 

French cuisine by region
Gascony